The flag of Riga is one of the official symbols of Riga, along with the coat of arms of Riga.

Design
The regulation on the flag of Riga, standard of the City Council chairman of Riga, and the flagship pennant of Riga, on the Riga City Council Binding Regulations No.181, states that :

Flag of Riga
The flag of Riga is divided into equal parts, with blue at the top and white at the bottom. 
The color ratio of the flag is 1:1. 
The ratio of the width and length of the flag is 1:2. 
The greater coat of arms of Riga on the flag is placed in the middle of the flag and depicted on the obverse and reverse sides of the flag, which is 2/5 of the width of the flag
For example, if the flag's dimensions are 1 × 2 m and 1.5 × 3 m; the heights of the coats of arms are 40 cm and 60 cm respectively.

Standard of the City Council chairman of Riga
The standard of the chairman of the Riga City Council is based on white fabric with 2 cm wide blue borders. 
On both sides of the white square is the greater coat of arms of Riga.
The coat of arms on the standard is 2/5 of the total standard's height. 
The standard dimensions are 30 cm long and 15 cm wide.

Flagship pennant of Riga
The flagship of Riga city flag is a trapezoidal fabric ribbon corresponding to the colors and color proportions of the Riga city flag.

Colours
The colours of the flag and the coat of arms are regulated in the Riga City Council Binding Regulations No.181.

Flag

Coat of arms

Regulation on the flagpole

The flag base's color is white. The upper end of the flagpole is flat, rounded, several centimeters larger than the diameter of the stem. The upper end of the chest may also be a decorative tapered, spherical, elliptical tip or cap, in which two crossed keys are represented.

Usage
The flag should be used free of charge by the person on the buildings in the administrative territory of Riga without the permission of the Symbolic Commission. The flag is permanently placed at the Riga City Council, the Riga City Municipality Administration and other buildings of the Riga City Municipality.

The flag is prohibited for use:

 at buildings in an emergency condition;
 at buildings for which the facade is being repaired;
 in a damaged or faded condition.

The flag can be used for representational and decorative purposes, maintaining proportions of certain length, width and color.

The flag is used on a flag-scale basis, meaning that the display of the flag should maintain the color and length-width ratio.

It is forbidden to use the flag pennant of Riga on buildings facades.

Persons who use the flag for commercial purposes must obtain from the Symbolic Commission a permission, as for the usage of the symbols of Riga.

History

For the first time, the flag of Riga was mentioned in 1232 (in the book vexillum civitatis Rigensis), but its color and form are not known. After Riga joining the Hanseatic League in 1282 sources mention that the flag of Riga ships has a white cross, but the shape and color of the flag are not indicated (in the beginning of the 14th century it was known that Riga had a black flag with a white cross). After 1582, the flag of Riga was white with a red coat of arms of the city, while in the middle 17th century, thanks to the city's heroism defending against Muscovite troops, the king of Sweden assigned his royal colors to Riga: a blue flag with a yellow cross, with in the center of the cross two keys were crossed on the red shield. The flag was used until 1860.

The blue-white flag of Riga, which was used today, was created in 1673, when it was approved in the statutes of Riga - blue and white bands in rectangular shape, with the coat of arms of Riga in the center. The flag was used along with the flag given by the Swedish king.

From the 1900s until 1917, a new tricolor flag with equal blue, red and white bands was approved for Riga.

During the 1920s the blue-white flag of Riga was restored, and officially approved on 4 May 1937 until 1940.

During the era of Soviet Latvia, Riga adopted a new flag, with different obverse and reverse side of the flag. The obverse side of the flag consisted of Lenin's portrait with a laurel branch and the inscription "Workers of the world, unite!" in Latvian. The reverse side of the flag consisted of the coat of arms of the Latvian SSR, and the inscription "Riga City" in both Latvian and Russian.

Current flag
The current flag, the blue-white flag was restored in 1995. The flag consisted of a horizontal bicolour of blue and white, with the coat of arms of Riga in the middle.

Gallery

References

Riga
Culture in Riga
History of Riga
Flags displaying animals
Flags introduced in 1995